Phymatocarpus maxwellii is a plant in the myrtle family, Myrtaceae and is endemic to the south-west of Western Australia. It resembles many small species of Melaleuca, mainly differing in the way its anthers are attached at the top of the stamens. In Phymatocarpus they are attached at their base and open at the other end through two slits. It is a shrub with many small heads of pink to purple flowers, often covering the plant for several weeks in October.

Description

There are 5 sepals, 5 petals and 5 bundles of stamens. It can be distinguished from the other two species of Phymatocarpus by it lack of a ring of stamens - both the others have the stamens joined in a ring at their bases. Flowering occurs from August to November and is followed by fruits which are woody capsules.

Taxonomy and naming
Phymatocarpus maxwellii was first formally described in 1875 by Ferdinand von Mueller in Fragmenta Phytographiae Australiae. The specific epithet (maxwellii) honours the botanical collector George Maxwell, the collector of the type specimen.

Distribution and habitat
Phymatocarpus maxwellii occurs in and between the Mount Barker East and the Israelite Bay districts in the Coolgardie, Esperance Plains and Mallee biogeographic regions. It grows in a wide range of situations but mostly in sand on sandplains and depressions that are wet in winter.

Conservation
Phymatocarpus maxwellii is classified as "not threatened" by the Western Australian government Department of Parks and Wildlife.

References

maxwellii
Myrtales of Australia
Plants described in 1860
Endemic flora of Western Australia
Taxa named by Ferdinand von Mueller